Ai no Wakusei (愛の惑星) is the only solo album by released by Sakurai Atsushi, vocalist for the Japanese rock band Buck-Tick. It was released on June 23, 2004 through Victor Entertainment. The album was packaged in a special long box, featuring a photo book, though it is also now out of print. Sakurai wrote all of the lyrics and sang on the album while the music was composed by a different collaborator on each track. Rather than adhere closely to Buck-Tick's style, Sakurai recruited composers whom come from various musical backgrounds, ranging from the hard industrial rock of Raymond Watts to the upbeat electronica of Xlover.

Three singles were released to promote the album, each having a music video. Sakurai toured to promote the album and a DVD of a live performance, "Explosion: Ai no Wakusei Live 2004" was released, though it is now out of print as well.

Track listing

Personnel
 Atsushi Sakurai - vocals

Production
 Atsushi Sakurai - producer
 Junichi Tanaka - executive producer
 Kotaro Kojima - engineer, mastering

References

Atsushi Sakurai albums
2004 debut albums
Victor Entertainment albums
Japanese-language albums